Henriette Jakobine Martine Gislesen, née Vibe (9 April 1809 – 20 May 1859) was a Norwegian writer.

Biography
Gislesen was born in Bergen, Norway. She was the sixth of eight children born to Niels Andreas Vibe (1759–1814) and Margery Kierulff (1775–1852). Her father served as County Governor of Nordre Bergenhus Amt.
Gislesen was a sister of Ludvig Vibe, sister-in-law of Heinrich Arnold Thaulow  and second cousin of Ludvig Cæsar Martin Aubert. When she was two years old, her family moved to Christiania in 1811 when her father was made General War Commissioner of Norway.
Gislesen's father died when Henriette was five years old  and her family established residence with Benoni Aubert (1768–1832) who was  married to a cousin of her mother.

Gislesen settled in Eiker near Drammen where she lived from 1844 to 1853. In 1851, she came into contact with Andreas Hauge, son of Hans Nielsen Hauge and founder of  the Norwegian Missionary Society. Subsequently, she became involved in missionary work. Together with Gustava Kielland, Gislesen was one of the most important spreaders of missionary interest among women. After some years she also debuted as a moralistic writer. In 1843 she released the book En Moders veiledende Ord til sin Datter ("A Mother's Guiding Words to her Daughter").  
Gislesen also wrote poems and stories that were published in newspapers and magazines. Like most female writers in her contemporary, she wrote anonymously. In time, Gislesen used her real name and published several books including textbooks for missionaries. Her memoirs were published posthumously in 1861, and a collection of her letters was published in 1885.

Personal life
Gislesen was married twice. In April 1829, she married her second cousin, Christian Frederik Glückstad (1803-1838). He died after nine years of marriage in 1838. In 1854, she married clergyman Knud Gislesen (1801-1860). He would later become  Bishop of the Diocese of Tromsø. From 1856, they lived in Tromsø where Gislesen died in May 1859.

Publications
 En moders veiledende ord til sin datter, 1843
 Erindringer fra det betydningsfuldeste Aar i mit Liv, 1861
 Meine Bekehrung, 1862
 Ein Bild aus der norwegischen Kirche, 1890

References

1809 births
1859 deaths
Writers from Bergen
Norwegian Lutheran missionaries
Norwegian memoirists
Women memoirists
19th-century Norwegian writers
19th-century Norwegian women writers
Female Christian missionaries
Protestant missionaries in Norway
19th-century memoirists
19th-century Lutherans
Henriette Vibe